Mikhail Ikonnikov (Mykhailo Stepanovych Ikonnikov) was a Kiev Guberniya architect, once famous among Kiev city residents.

In 1840 Ikonnikov graduated from the Peterburg Institute of Civil Engineers. He then worked in Kiev in the Governorate Construction Commission as a senior engineer, later as an architect. From  1854 to 1895, Ikonnikov was the Architect of Guberniya. In 1854-57 together with academician  and architect K.Skarzhynsky, he built the government building on Sofia Square in Kiev.

In architecture he preferred forms of Neo-Renaissance, Neo-Gothic and Neo-Russian styles. Ikonnikov used the Eclectic style for the chapel (1869) and tombstone of Aleksandr Bezak and his wife located in the Kiev Caves Monastery.

Mikhail Ikonnikov is a brother of Vladimir Ikonnikov.

Works
 Government building at Sofia Square (1854–57)
 Lukyanivska Prison, Kiev (1860)
 Church of Nicholas Naberzhny, Kiev (1863)
 University clinic buildings (1873–83)

External links
 Profile at the National Kiev Caves Historic Cultural Preserve
 Profile at the Portal of Kiev history

1818 births
1897 deaths
Architects from Kyiv
Russian architects
Saint-Petersburg State University of Architecture and Civil Engineering alumni